Lobos Partido is a partido of Buenos Aires Province in Argentina.

Attractions

Lobos Aeroclub
Lobos Museum of Natural Science
Birthplace of Juan Domingo Perón

Districts
Antonio Carboni:  from Lobos
Elvira:  from Lobos
José Santos Arévalo
Lobos (district capital)
Empalme Lobos
Las Chacras
Salvador María:  from Lobos
Zapiola:  from Lobos

References

External links

 

1864 establishments in Argentina
Partidos of Buenos Aires Province
Partido